Cortinarius puniceus is a species of fungus in the genus Cortinarius. It is closely related to Cortinarius sanguineus, which grows under conifers.

See also
List of Cortinarius species

References

puniceus
Fungi of Europe
Fungi described in 1958
Inedible fungi